Divided We Fall may refer to:
 "United we stand, divided we fall", a motto

 "Divided We Fall" (short story), by Raymond F. Jones
 Divided We Fall (film), a 2000 Czech film directed by Jan Hřebejk
 Divided We Fall (album), a 2016 album by Flaw
 Divided We Fall (video game), a 2016 real-time strategy game
 "Divided We Fall" (Justice League Unlimited episode), a 2005 episode of Justice League Unlimited

See also

 
 
 United We Stand (disambiguation)
 United We Fall (disambiguation)
 Divided We Stand (disambiguation)